Cosme Anvene Ebang Elá (born 3 December 1990), simply known as Cosme, is an Equatoguinean footballer who plays as a defender for Deportivo Unidad, where he serves as captain, and the Equatorial Guinea national team.

Club career
Cosme has played for The Panthers FC and Deportivo Unidad in Equatorial Guinea.

International career
Cosme made his international debut for Equatorial Guinea in 2015.

References

1990 births
Living people
People from Añisoc
Equatoguinean footballers
Association football defenders
The Panthers F.C. players
Equatorial Guinea international footballers
Equatorial Guinea A' international footballers
2018 African Nations Championship players
Age controversies